Diario is a daily, family-owned newspaper written in the Papiamento language and published in Aruba. The managing editor is Jossy Mansur.

References

External links 
https://web.archive.org/web/20050831093635/http://www.diarioaruba.com/diahuebs/noticia/index.html

Newspapers published in Aruba
Publications with year of establishment missing
Papiamento-language mass media